TTT or Triple T may stand for:

 TTT (education), a life skills education program in India
 TT Technologies, a construction equipment manufacturer
 Taitung Airport, IATA code
 Talk TV (Philippine TV network), an English-language news and talk television network in the Philippines
 Team time trial, a bicycle racing event
 Tekken Tag Tournament, the fourth installment of the Tekken fighting game series
 Tic-tac-toe, a game
 Tilt table test, a medical test for dysautonomia and/or syncope
 Time-temperature transformation, a plot of temperature versus time; see Isothermal transformation diagram
 Tres tristes tigres (novel), a 1967 novel by Guillermo Cabrera Infante
 Trinidad and Tobago Television, a television network in Trinidad and Tobago
 "Triple T", former name of radio station Sea FM
 Triple Trip Touch, a free-jazz band
 Trouble in Terrorist Town, a mod for Garry's Mod
 The Two Towers (1954) or its 2002 film adaptation, from Lord of the Rings by J.R.R. Tolkien
 Morse code prefix for messages announcing safety warnings, equivalent of Sécurité
 The production code for the 1973 Doctor Who serial The Green Death
 A codon for the amino acid Phenylalanine

See also 
 TT (disambiguation)
 3T (disambiguation)
 T3 (disambiguation)